Obok may refer to one of two terms 
Obock
Oboq